Peace may refer to:

 Peace: a generic term for a state of tranquility or harmony
 Peace (law), various legal protections offered to people in a specific area, by a court, head of state or legislature
 World peace
 Inner peace

Peace may also refer to:

Arts and entertainment

Music 
 Peace (band), an English rock band
 Peace (rapper), Mtulazaji Davis, American rapper
 The Peace, a 1970s zamrock band

Albums 
 Peace (Anything Box album), 1990
 Peace (Bethel Music album) or the title song, 2020
 Peace (Bill Dixon and Archie Shepp album), originally Archie Shepp – Bill Dixon Quartet, 1962
 Peace (Chet Baker album), 1982
 Peace (The Cult album), 2000
 Peace (Dayna Stephens album) or the title song, 2014
 Peace (Demon Hunter album) or the title song, 2019
 Peace (Eurythmics album), 1999
 Peace (Graveyard album), 2018
 Peace (Ira Sullivan album), 1979
 Peace (Jim Brickman album) or the title song, 2003
 Peace (Levellers album), 2020
 Peace (Libera album), 2010
 Peace  (Vista Chino album), 2013
 Peace (Walt Dickerson album), 1976
 Peace (York album) or the title song, 2006
 Peace, Vol. II by Bethel Music, 2021
 P.E.A.C.E. (album) (International P.E.A.C.E. Benefit Compilation), 1984
 Peace, by Kids in Glass Houses, 2013

Songs 
 "Peace" (Depeche Mode song), 2009
 "Peace" (Horace Silver song), 1959
 "Peace" (Sabrina Johnston song), 1991
 "Peace" (Taylor Swift song), 2020
 "The Peace!", by Morning Musume, 2001
 "Peace", by Alison Wonderland, 2019
 "Peace", by Hillsong Young & Free from III, 2018
 "Peace", by Katey Sagal from Well..., 1994
 "Peace", by Ornette Coleman from The Shape of Jazz to Come, 1959
 "Peace", by the Outfield from Any Time Now, 2006
 "Peace", by Vixen from Tangerine, 1998
 "Peace", by Weezer from Make Believe, 2005

Other media
 Peace (film), a 2021 Indian Malayalam film
 Peace (novel), a 1975 novel by Gene Wolfe
 Peace (play), by Aristophanes
 Peace (Saville), a 1922 sculpture by Bruce Wilder Saville
 Peace Magazine, a Canadian pacifist periodical

Mythology and religion
 Eirene (goddess), a goddess in Greek mythology known as Peace
 Pax (goddess), a goddess in Roman mythology known as Peace
 P.E.A.C.E. Plan, an initiative begun by Saddleback Church in Lake Forest, California, US

People
 Peace (surname), a list of people with the name
 Peace Adzo Medie, Liberian-born Ghanaian academic and writer
 Peace Anyiam-Osigwe, Nigerian filmmaker
 Peace Ayisi Otchere, Ghanaian banker; first female director of the African Development Bank
 Peace Butera, Ugandan culinary artist
 Peace Efih (born 2000), Nigerian footballer
 Peace Hyde, British Ghanaian education activist and media personality
 Peace Kusasira (born 1962), Ugandan politician and social worker
 Peace Mabe (born 1976), South African politician
 Peace Mutuuzo (born 1975), Ugandan politician
 Peace Uzoamaka Nnaji (born 1952), Nigerian politician
 Peace Proscovia (born 1989), Ugandan netball player
 Peace Uko (born 1995), Nigerian sprinter
 Peace Uwase (born 1978), Rwandan accountant and bank executive

Other uses 
 Peace (cigarette), a Japanese brand
 Peace (rose) or Rosa Peace, a garden rose
 Peace, an iOS content blocker application by Marco Arment
 Peace Coffee, an American coffee company based in Minneapolis, Minnesota
 Peace Iced Tea, a Coca-Cola Company brand
 Peace College, Raleigh, North Carolina, US
 PEACE method of interrogation

See also 

 
 
 List of periods of regional peace
 Municipal District of Peace No. 135, Alberta, Canada
 Peace symbol
 Peace treaty
 Peace River (disambiguation)
 Peace Bridge (disambiguation)
 Peace process (disambiguation)
 Pax (disambiguation)
 Peace Fund, a charitable organization
 United States Department of Peace
 Pea (disambiguation), including peas
 Pease (disambiguation)
 Piece (disambiguation)